Shivalik Public School (SPS) is an English-medium, private, co-educational residential-cum-day school located in Sector 56, Mohali, India, with three subsidiaries in Chandigarh, Patiala, and Nawanshahr.  The school was established in 1970.It is affiliated to the Central Board of Secondary Education (CBSE). The school caters to pupils from kindergarten up to class 12. It has been ranked as number 1st in Mohali, 3rd in Punjab and 88th in India.

Campus site and layout
There is a provision for about 500 students in its residential school. The school has  an indoor deco-turf tennis court, astro -turf hockey ground, auditorium and a multi-purpose Gymnasium.

Curriculum
The school curriculum is based on the national pattern of education and is designed as per CBSE guidelines. The school holds classes from lower kindergarten up to senior secondary stage with English as the medium of instruction and offers Arts and Science subjects along with Computer Science. G. K. and Moral Education form an essential part of the school curriculum. Hindi and Punjabi are taught as second languages. Punjabi, the regional language is compulsory  up to class 10. 

The academic year which commences in April consists of two terms. The first term is from April till September and the second term is from October till March. Tests are conducted periodically and examinations are held at the end of every term. At the end of each semester students appear for the CBSE Examinations.

School life

Motto and song
The school's motto is 'Victory With Determination'. The school song is Deh Siva Var Mohe. It is generally sung during the morning assembly and on special occasions.

House system
There are four houses: Pratap House named after Maharana Pratap, Azad House named after Chandra Shekhar Azad, Ranjit House named after Maharaja Ranjit Singh, Subhash House named after Subhas Chandra Bose. The houses have their house captains for both girls and boys.

Each student is allotted a house. Each house is headed by a girl House captain. A member of the staff assisted by several other teachers acts as the House Warden. Awards are given to the students for extra-curricular activities through inter-house competitions in sports, quiz, etc.

Boarding schools in Punjab, India
Primary schools in India
High schools and secondary schools in Punjab, India
Sahibzada Ajit Singh Nagar district
1972 establishments in Chandigarh
Educational institutions established in 1972

Notable Almuni 

Harnaaz Sandhu Miss universe 2021